Klips ve Onlar was a Turkish band of the 1980s.

They represented Turkey in the Eurovision Song Contest 1986 with the song Halley which reached 9th position, the highest ever for the country until then.

The group members who won the national final were Sevingül Bahadır, Gür Akad, Emre Tukur, Derya Bozkurt and Seden Kutlubay. However Kutlubay refused to go to Eurovision (rumours said that she had important exams in the week of the finals, and that her boyfriend didn't want her to go), therefore she was replaced by Candan Erçetin.

Turkish musical groups
Eurovision Song Contest entrants for Turkey
Eurovision Song Contest entrants of 1986
İzel Çeliköz